Aru is a town and the seat of Aru Territory in the Ituri Province of the Democratic Republic of the Congo. In 2004 its population was estimated to be 26,290. Aru has a small airport but no public electricity grid as of 2010.

References

Populated places in Ituri Province